Huang Chun-ming (born 13 February 1935) is a Taiwanese literary figure and teacher. Huang writes mainly about the tragic and sometimes humorous lives of ordinary Taiwanese people, and many of his short stories have been turned into films, including The Sandwich Man (1983).

Career
Born in Ratō Town, Taihoku Prefecture, Japanese Taiwan (modern-day Luodong, Yilan, Taiwan), Huang began his higher education career at a college in Taipei but, after a series of transfers, ended up graduating from National Pingtung University of Education in southern Taiwan.  He is a writer of broad interests and remarkable versatility, but he is first of all a short story writer. During the 1960s as a major contributor to the influential Literature Quarterly, Huang was hailed as a representative of the Taiwan Nativist Literature movement that focused on the lives of rural Taiwanese people. In more recent works he has turned his attention to urban culture and life in Taiwan's growing cities.

Starting in the 1990s, he established and has written for and directed the Big Fish Children's Theater Troupe (黃大魚兒童劇團).

He opened a cafe and salon in his native Yilan, operating it for three years before closing it in December 2015.

Influences 
Huang has said that in his early years he had limited access to literature in Chinese and that significant influences were Ernest Hemingway's The Old Man and the Sea and "The Killers"; Mark Twain's Tom Sawyer, Adventures of Huckleberry Finn, and "The Celebrated Jumping Frog of Calaveras County"; William Faulkner's "A Rose for Emily," "The Bear," The Wild Palms, and other American literature.  Two other important influences were an anthology of short stories by Shen Congwen and a Chinese translation of stories by Anton Chekhov.

English translations
The major translation of Huang's work into English is The Taste of Apples (Howard Goldblatt trans). New York: Columbia University Press, 2001. (The Taste of Apples was previously published in a slightly different form as The Drowning of an Old Cat and Other Stories, (Howard Goldblatt trans.). Bloomington: Indiana University Press, 1980.)

Alternate translations of individual stories in the Taste of Apples collection are shown in the associated article.

Other English language translations of Huang's work (found at http://mclc.osu.edu/rc/bib.htm):

"Ah-Ban and the Cop." Tr. Howard Goldblatt. The Chinese Pen (Summer, 1981): 94-98.

"Father's Writings Have Been Republished, Or, The Sexuality of Women Students in a Taipei Bookstore." Tr. Raymond N. Tang. In Helmut Martin, ed., Modern Chinese Writers: Self-portrayals. Armonk, NY: M.E. Sharpe, 1992, 204-208.

"A Flower in the Rainy Night." Tr. Earl Wieman. In Joseph S.M. Lau, ed., Chinese Stories From Taiwan: 1960-1970. NY: Columbia UP, 1976, 195-241.

"Hung T'ung, the Mad Artist." Tr. Jack Langlois. In Wai-lim Yip, ed., Chinese Arts and Literature: A Survey of Recent Trends. Occasional Papers/Reprint Series in Contemporary Asian Studies. Baltimore, 1977, 117-26.

"I Love Mary." Tr. Howard Goldblatt. In Joseph S.M. Lau, ed., The Unbroken Chain: An Anthology of Taiwan Fiction Since 1926. Bloomington: IUP, 1983, 133-74.

"Waiting for a Flower's Name" [Dengdai yiduo hua de mingzi]. Tr. David Pollard. In Pollard, ed., The Chinese Essay. NY: Columbia UP, 2000, 345-49.

"We Cant' Bring Back the Past" [Wangshi zhi neng huimei]. Tr. David Pollard. In Pollard, ed., The Chinese Essay. NY: Columbia UP, 2000, 340-45.

"Young Widow." In Rosemary Haddon, tr./ed, Oxcart: Nativist Stories from Taiwan, 1934-1977. Dortmund: Projekt Verlag, 1996, 221-304.

Notes

Portrait 
    Huang Chunming. A Portrait by Kong Kai Ming at Portrait Gallery of Chinese Writers (Hong Kong Baptist University Library).

External links

 Interview with Huang
 Taiwan xiangtu wenxue: the sojourner-narrator

Taiwanese male novelists
1935 births
Living people
Taiwanese Buddhists
People from Luodong, Yilan County, Taiwan
National Pingtung University of Education alumni
20th-century Taiwanese short story writers
Taiwanese male short story writers
20th-century male writers